Anthidium septemspinosum is a species of bee in the family Megachilidae, the leaf-cutter, carder, or mason bees.

References

External links
Images
Images

septemspinosum
Insects described in 1841
Taxa named by Amédée Louis Michel le Peletier